The gray vireo (Vireo vicinior) is a small North American passerine bird. It breeds from the southwestern United States and northern Baja California to western Texas. It is a migrant, wintering in northwestern Mexico, in western Sonora state, and the southern Baja Peninsula in Baja California Sur; it remains all year only in Big Bend National Park in southwest Texas. This vireo frequents dry brush, especially juniper, on the slopes of the southwestern mountains.

Description
It has a short, thick bill. Sexes are similar. The sideways twitching of its tail is unique among vireos and is reminiscent of that of gnatcatchers. The song is hu-wee, chu-wee, che-weet, chee, ch-churr-weet, churr, schray.

Behavior
The gray vireo has skulking habits and is difficult to observe in the dense vegetation it inhabits which is mostly pinyon-juniper woodland or scrub oak woodland. It feeds mainly on insects, and birds that overwinter in Mexico additionally consume fruit. Nests are built within  of the ground, often in a thorny tree and consist of dry grasses, plant remains, shreds of bark and spider's web, lined with grasses and fine fibres. A clutch of three or four white eggs is laid and incubated by both parents for about thirteen days. The young leave the nest a fortnight later. Attempted parasitism by the brown-headed cowbird (Molothrus ater) often causes the nest to be abandoned.

References

External links
Gray Vireo photo gallery VIREO Photo-High Res--(Close-up)
Photo-High Res

gray vireo
Endemic birds of Southwestern North America
Native birds of the Southwestern United States
Birds of Mexico
Fauna of the Sonoran Desert
Fauna of the Chihuahuan Desert
Birds of the Rio Grande valleys

gray vireo